Livermore Valley Joint Unified School District (LVJUSD) is a public school district located in Livermore, California, United States. It is located in Alameda County. Since May 2010, the Superintendent has been Kelly Bowers.

In addition to Livermore, it includes a very small portion of Pleasanton.

The district operates 19 schools: nine elementary (K–5) schools, three middle (6-8) schools, two K-8 schools, two comprehensive high schools and three alternative high schools. There previously were also two charter schools in the area, one K-8 and one high school, both operated by the Tri-Valley Learning Corporation, a local 501(c)3 not-for-profit organization founded by parents and teachers.

Schools

Elementary
 Altamont Creek
 Arroyo Seco, a K–5 grade school with approximately 700 students
 Emma C. Smith
 Jackson Avenue
 Leo R. Croce (K-5)
 Lawrence Elementary (TK-5)
 Marylin Avenue 
 Rancho Las Positas
 Sunset
 Vineyard

K-8
Joe Michell K-8 School
Junction Avenue K-8 School

Middle
 Christensen
 East Avenue
 William Mendenhall

High
 Del Valle and Phoenix Continuation High Schools, two schools sharing one building since 2004
 Granada High School, Livermore's second high school
 Livermore High School, established in 1891 as California's first union high school
 Vineyard High School, an alternative independent study school

Adult education
 Livermore Adult School

Charter schools (closed)
 Livermore Valley Charter School (closed due to conflicts of interest and fiscal problems within the Tri-Valley Learning Corporation [TVLC])
Livermore Valley Charter Preparatory (high school) (closed due to conflicts of interest and fiscal problems within the Tri-Valley Learning Corporation [TVLC])

References

External links
 
 LVJUSD public schools site list
 Leo R. Croce School
 Marylin Avenue Elementary School
 Livermore Valley Charter School
 Livermore Valley Charter Preparatory High School
 Tri-Valley Learning Corp., a not-for-profit charter school management organization
 Alameda County Office of Education
 California Department of Education

School districts in Alameda County, California
Livermore, California
Livermore Valley